Jaan-Peeter Volmer (12 February 1940 Tartu – 7 November 2002 Pärnu) was an Estonian singer (baritone) and actor.

From 1958 until 1962, he studied medicine at Tartu State University. From 1964 until 1968, he studied singing at Tartu Music School. From 1962 until 1977, he performed with the Vanemuine theatre's choir. From 1980 until 1999, he worked at Endla Theatre. He has also played in several films (e.g. Perekond Männard, 1960).

He was the father of the opera singer Priit Volmer.

Opera roles

 Miguel (Prokofjev's "Kihlus kloostris", 1962)
 Gardefeu (Offenbach's "Pariisi elu", 1964)
 Semjon (Kabalevski's "Kevad laulab", 1964)

References

1940 births
2002 deaths
20th-century Estonian male singers
Estonian male film actors
Estonian male stage actors
20th-century Estonian male actors
University of Tartu alumni
Male actors from Tartu
Musicians from Tartu